Blue Meridian: The Search for the Great White Shark is a 1971 non-fiction nature book by the American author Peter Matthiessen. He writes of a 17-month expedition he undertook with Peter Gimbel to photograph great whites underwater. The book recounts, then, the production of the documentary Blue Water, White Death.

References

1971 non-fiction books
Nature books